The 2021–22 season was Gabala FK's 17th season, and their 16th in the Azerbaijan Premier League, the top-flight of Azerbaijani football.

Season events
On 9 June, Gabala announced the return of Urfan Abbasov on a one-year contract from Sabail. 9 Days later, 18 June 2021, Magsad Isayev also joined Gabala from Sabail, signing a two-year contract.

On 7 July, Gabala announced the signing of Nijat Mehbaliyev on a season-long loan deal from Sabah.

On 19 July, Gabala announced the signing of Christophe Atangana to a two-year contract from Bilbao Athletic.

On 30 July, Gabala announced the signing of Isnik Alimi to a one-year contract from Atalanta.

On 5 August, Gabala announced the signing of Ruan Renato from Ponte Preta on a one-year contract, with the option of an additional year.

On 1 September, Gabala announced the signing of Omar Hani to a one-year contract, with the option of an additional year, from APOEL.

On 8 October, Fernań López returned to Gabala after leaving Jagiellonia Białystok during the summer, on a contract until the summer of 2022.

On 11 January, Gabala announced the signing of Patrick on loan from Admira Wacker until the summer of 2023.

On 31 January, Gabala announced the signing of Samet Karakoc from Bayrampaşa until the summer of 2023.

Gabala's match against Zira on 13 March was postponed in the 65th minute due to weather conditions, with the remaining 25 minutes being played on 14 March at 12:30.

Squad

Transfers

In

Loans in

Out

Released

Friendlies

Competitions

Overview

Premier League

Results summary

Results by round

Results

League table

Azerbaijan Cup

Squad statistics

Appearances and goals

|-
|colspan="14"|Players away on loan:
|-
|colspan="14"|Players who left Gabala during the season:
|}

Goal scorers

Clean sheets

Disciplinary record

References

External links 
Gabala FC Website

Gabala FC seasons
Azerbaijani football clubs 2021–22 season